Lucky Stiff is a 2014 American musical comedy film directed by Christopher Ashley and starring Jason Alexander and Dennis Farina (in his final film role).  It is based on the 1988 musical of the same name by Lynn Ahrens and Stephen Flaherty and the 1983 novel The Man Who Broke the Bank at Monte Carlo by Mike Butterworth.

Cast
Dominic Marsh as Harry Witherspoon
Nikki M. James as Annabel Glick
Pamela Shaw as Rita LaPorta
Jason Alexander as Vinnie Di Ruzzio
Dennis Farina as Luigi Guadi
Don Amendolia as Uncle Tony
Katherine Shindle as Dominique
Mary Birdsong as Maid
Anthony Skordi as Nicky
Jayne Houdyshell as Harry's Landlady
Maggie Carney as Miss. Iris Crum
Kent Avenido as Boy Hardwick
Herschel Sparber as Bill Siller
Steve West as Harry's Boss
Mary Jo Catlett as Shoe Store Lady
Noah Weisberg as Bellhop
Cheyenne Jackson as Emcee
Jennifer Cody as Mary Alice
Jim Piddock as Mr. Hobbs
Juliet Mills as Miss Thorsby
Benjamin Stone as Telegraph Boy
Paul Tigue as Mr. Loomis
Kevin Chamberlin as Fred Mahew III
Heather Ayers as Mrs. Delila Wagstiff-Duncan
Chryssie Whitehead as Miss. Coco Blankship

Production
The film was shot in Los Angeles and Monte Carlo.

Release
The film premiered at the 2014 Montreal World Film Festival.  It was then released in theaters and on VOD on July 24, 2015.

Reception
The film has a 40% rating on Rotten Tomatoes.  Wes Greene of Slant Magazine awarded the film half a star out of four.

Dennis Harvey of Variety gave the film a negative review and wrote, "Results are equal parts diverting and strained, most likely to please the same niche audiences who have given the material a modest stage shelf life for the last quarter-century."

References

External links
 
 

American musical comedy films
2014 comedy films
Films shot in Los Angeles
Films based on musicals
Films based on British novels
2010s English-language films
Films directed by Christopher Ashley
2010s American films